Devi is the Sanskrit word for goddess.

Devi may also refer to:

Characters 
 Devi d., a character in Johnny the Homicidal Maniac
 Devi, a character in The Name of the Wind by Patrick Rothfuss
 Devi (comics), a character in Virgin Comics
 Devi, Max Cohen's love interest in π
 Devi (monster), a monster of Georgian mythology
 Devi Vishwakumar, a character in Never Have I Ever

Films and TV 
 Devi (1960 film), an Indian Bengali film by Satyajit Ray
 Devi (1970 film), an Indian Hindi film by V. Madhusudhana Rao
 Devi (1972 film), an Indian Malayalam film by K. S. Sethumadhavan
 Devi (1999 film), an Indian Telugu film by Kodi Ramakrishna, winner of a Nandi Award for Best Child Actor
 Devi (2016 film), an Indian Tamil film by A. L. Vijay, also known as Abhinetri in Telugu and Tutak Tutak Tutiya in Hindi
 Debi (2018 film), a Bangladeshi film
Devi (2020 film), an Indian Hindi-language short film 
 Devi (TV series), an Indian TV series aired between 2002 and 2004
Maharakshak: Devi, an Indian TV series aired in 2015.
 Devi, a 1999 episode of Xena: Warrior Princess

Places 
 Devi, Khyber Pakhtunkhwa, a village in Khyber Pakhtunkhwa, Pakistan
 Devi, Punjab, a town in Punjab, Pakistan

People with the given name 
 Devi, the first wife of the third Mauryan emperor, Ashoka
 Devi S., Indian film actress and dubbing artist in Malayalam movies
 Kamala Devi Harris (born 1964), American politician, Vice President of the United States

People with the surname 

Bibhu Kumari Devi (born 1944), Indian National Congress politician
 Mahasweta Devi (1926–2016), Indian writer
 Phoolan Devi (1963–2001), Indian "Bandit Queen"
 Priyamvada Devi (1871–1935), Bengali writer and philanthropist
 S. Hemalatha Devi (born 1922), Indian independence activist
 Savitri Devi or Maximiani Portas (1905–1982), French writer
 Shakuntala Devi (1929–2013), calculating prodigy
 Shanti Devi (1926–1987), Indian woman who claimed to be reincarnated
 Shanti Devi (born 1937), Indian politician
 Sita Devi (1914–2005), Indian folk art painter
 T. Kalpana Devi (1941–2016), doctor and politician from Andhra Pradesh
 Lok Priya Devi, Nepalese poet

See also 
 Devi (surname)
 Devi Mahatmya, an ancient Hindu text about the goddess
Kahaani, a 2012 Indian film with strong allusions to the Hindu Goddess Durga (Devi)
 Devi inflection
 Davy (disambiguation)
 Davi (disambiguation)
 Mahadevi